Gegham Vardanyan (born 29 March 1988 in Yerevan, Armenia) is an Armenian figure skater. He is the 2005 Armenian national champion.

Results

External links
 

Armenian figure skaters
Sportspeople from Yerevan
Living people
1988 births